Jana Mrázková née Dočekalová (born 20 March 1940) is a Czech former figure skater who competed in ladies' singles for Czechoslovakia. She is the 1961 European bronze medalist and appeared at two Winter Olympics, finishing fourth in 1960 and 25th in 1964. She was coached by Hilda Múdra.

Results

References

Czechoslovak female single skaters
Czech female single skaters
Olympic figure skaters of Czechoslovakia
Figure skaters at the 1960 Winter Olympics
Figure skaters at the 1964 Winter Olympics
1940 births
Living people
Figure skaters from Brno
European Figure Skating Championships medalists